Indurkani is a village in Pattashi Union, Indurkani Upazila, Pirojpur District in the Barisal Division of southwestern Bangladesh.

References

Populated places in Pirojpur District